Uta Poreceanu-Schlandt (13 November 1936 – 27 January 2018) was a Romanian artistic gymnast. Born in Braşov, Romania, she was an Olympic bronze medalist with the team.

References

1936 births
2018 deaths
Sportspeople from Brașov
Romanian female artistic gymnasts
Gymnasts at the 1960 Summer Olympics
Olympic gymnasts of Romania
Olympic bronze medalists for Romania
Olympic medalists in gymnastics
Medalists at the 1960 Summer Olympics